IPDI may stand for:
 Isophorone diisocyanate, an organic compound used in some special enamel coatings
 Institute for Politics, Democracy & the Internet at George Washington University
 Immediate Post-Death Interests a form of trust in England and Wales that can offer tax advantages